The Anglo-French Joint Naval Commission was in charge of the territory of the New Hebrides in the period 1887–1889 and again in 1890–1906. It was briefly suspended by the constitution of the unrecognized independent state of Franceville.

History

During the 19th century, many Australian, British, French, and German settlers settled in the territory of the New Hebrides.

In 1878 the United Kingdom and France declared all of the New Hebrides to be neutral territory.

The New Hebrides became a neutral territory under the loose jurisdiction of the Commission, established by a Convention on 16 October 1887, for the sole purpose of protecting French and British citizens, but claimed no jurisdiction over internal native affairs.

References

States and territories established in 1887
States and territories disestablished in 1906
1887 establishments in Oceania
1906 disestablishments in Oceania